James Chamberlayne Pickett (February 6, 1793, Fauquier County, Virginia – July 10, 1872 Washington, DC) was superintendent of the American Patent Office beginning on February 1, 1835 (he resigned on April 30, 1835, to become the fourth auditor of the Treasury Department), Secretary of State of Kentucky, lawyer, newspaper editor and diplomat.

Pickett graduated from West Point and went on to serve in the United States Army during the War of 1812.  He returned to Kentucky and practiced law as well as editing a newspaper before being elected to the Kentucky legislature.  He spent a total of eleven years as a diplomat in South America and was editor of the Congressional Globe.  He was Chargé d'Affaires in Peru (Appointed: June 9, 1838; Presentation of Credentials: January 30, 1840; Termination of Mission: Superseded April 28, 1845).

References

External links
Notes for James Chamberlayne Pickett and Ellen Desha

Secretaries of State of Kentucky
United States Military Academy alumni
United States Superintendents of Patents
Ambassadors of the United States to Peru
1793 births
1872 deaths
Editors of Kentucky newspapers
Members of the Kentucky General Assembly
Military personnel from Kentucky
United States Army personnel of the War of 1812